Nkana Stadium, previously known as Scrivener Stadium, is a multi-use stadium in Kitwe, Zambia. It serves as home stadium for MTN/FAZ Super League side Nkana F.C. 

The stadium underwent extensive renovations in 2013 that were sponsored by Mopani Copper Mines.

In 1959 the stadium hosted a friendly between Northern Rhodesia and Bolton Wanderers.

References

External links
 Stadium information

Football venues in Zambia
Kitwe
Buildings and structures in Copperbelt Province
Nkana F.C.